Glasgow Green was a railway station in the east end of Glasgow, Scotland.

The station was opened on 1 November 1895 and closed on 1 January 1917. It reopened on 1 June 1919 and closed again on 2 November 1953. The station then sat unused on the Argyle Line of the Glasgow suburban railway network, with no plans to reopen and its platforms removed. The lettering of the station name was in the same style of other Caledonian Stations, most notably on the main canopy of Glasgow Central.

On 20 March 2012, what remained of the station's façade (the southern and western walls, their windows and doorways bricked up) was demolished. Network Rail cited public safety as the reason, claiming the façade had become unsafe after sustaining storm damage.

References

External links
Some pictures of Glasgow Green Station in 2002

Disused railway stations in Glasgow
Railway stations in Great Britain opened in 1895
Railway stations in Great Britain closed in 1917
Railway stations in Great Britain opened in 1919
Railway stations in Great Britain closed in 1953
Former Caledonian Railway stations
Glasgow Green
Demolished buildings and structures in Scotland